The 1999–2000 season was Villarreal Club de Fútbol's 77th season in existence and the club's first season back in the second division of Spanish football following relegation at the end of the 1998–99 La Liga season. In addition to the domestic league, Villarreal participated in this season's edition of the Copa del Rey. The season covered the period from 1 July 1999 to 30 June 2000.

Competitions

Overall record

Segunda División

League table

Results summary

Results by round

Matches

Source:

Copa del Rey

First round

Second round

Round of 16

References

Villarreal CF seasons
Villarreal